Carphephorus odoratissimus (syn. Trilisa odoratissima), common name vanillaleaf, is a species of North American plants in the family Asteraceae. This species is native to the southeastern United States, including the states of Georgia, North Carolina, South Carolina, Alabama, Mississippi, Louisiana, and Florida.

Carphephorus odoratissimus is a herbaceous perennial up to 180 cm (6 feet) in height, and is largely glabrous. It produces a flat-topped inflorescence with many small purplish flower heads containing disc florets but no ray florets.

Varieties
 Carphephorus odoratissimus var. odoratissimus - Georgia, North Carolina, South Carolina, Alabama, Mississippi, Louisiana, and Florida
 Carphephorus odoratissimus var. subtropicanus Wunderlin & B.F.Hansen - Central and South Florida

Uses
Carphephorus odoratissimus var. odoratissimus was given the common name vanillaleaf in reference to the vanilla-like odor that emanates from its foliage, which is due to the high (1.6%) content of coumarin as its major aromatic constituent. As a result, this variety has a history of use in cosmetics, herbal medicine, and as an additive to smoking tobacco.

References

External links
Florida Native Plant Society
Atlas of Florida Vascular Plants
Lady Bird Johnson Wildflower Center, University of Texas
Alabama Plant Atlas
photo of herbarium specimen collected in Mississippi

Eupatorieae
Flora of the Southeastern United States
Plants described in 1792
Taxa named by Johann Friedrich Gmelin
Flora without expected TNC conservation status